Dhenkanal Law College commonly known as DLC is a Government Law Institute situated at Station Bazar in Dhenkanal in the Indian state of Odisha. It offers 3 years LL.B. and 2 years Master of Laws (LL.M) courses approved by the Bar Council of India (BCI) and it is affiliated to Utkal University.

History 
Dhenkanal Law College was established in 1981. The college was permanently recognized by Government of Odisha and accredited by NAAC: "C" Grade with CGPA 1.96.

References 

Educational institutions established in 1981
1981 establishments in Orissa
Universities and colleges in Odisha
Law schools in Odisha
Colleges affiliated to Utkal University